Ryatamak (Rätamaq) is a rural locality (a selo) and the administrative centre of Ryatamaksky Selsoviet, Yermekeyevsky District, Bashkortostan, Russia. The population was 220 as of 2010. There are 7 streets.

Geography 
Ryatamak is located 11 km west of Yermekeyevo (the district's administrative centre) by road. Suyermetovo is the nearest rural locality.

References 

Rural localities in Yermekeyevsky District